Three United States Navy vessels have borne the name USS Pigeon, after the pigeon:

  was the lead ship of her class of submarine rescue ship, laid down in 1968 and struck in 1992.

References 

United States Navy ship names